A riverboat is a watercraft designed for inland navigation on lakes, rivers, and artificial waterways. They are generally equipped and outfitted as work boats in one of the carrying trades, for freight or people transport, including luxury units constructed for entertainment enterprises, such as lake or harbour tour boats. As larger water craft, virtually all riverboats are especially designed and constructed, or alternatively, constructed with special-purpose features that optimize them as riverine or lake service craft, for instance, dredgers, survey boats, fisheries management craft, fireboats and law enforcement patrol craft.

Design differences
Riverboats are usually less sturdy than ships built for the open seas, with limited navigational and rescue equipment, as they do not have to withstand the high winds or large waves characteristic to large lakes, seas or oceans.  They can thus be built from light composite materials.  They are limited in size by width and depth of the river as well as the height of bridges spanning the river.  They can be designed with shallow drafts, as were the paddle wheel steamers on the Mississippi River that could operate in water under two metres deep.

While a ferry is often used to cross a river, a riverboat is used to travel along the course of the river, while carrying passengers or cargo, or both, for revenue. (Vessels like 'riverboat casinos' are not considered here, as they are essentially stationary.)

The significance of riverboats is dependent on the number of navigable rivers and channels as well as the condition of the road and rail network. Generally speaking, riverboats provide slow but cheap transport especially suited for bulk cargo and containers.

History

As early as 20,000 BC people started fishing in rivers and lakes using rafts and dugouts. Roman sources dated 50 BC mention extensive transportation of goods and people on the river Rhine. Upstream, boats were usually powered by sails or oars. In the Middle Ages, towpaths were built along most waterways to use working animals or people to pull riverboats. In the 19th century, steamboats became common.

The most famous riverboats were on the rivers of the midwestern and central southern United States, on the Mississippi, Ohio and Missouri rivers in the early 19th century. Out west, riverboats were common transportation on the Colorado, Columbia, and Sacramento rivers. These American riverboats were designed to draw very little water, and in fact it was commonly said that they could "navigate on a heavy dew".

Australia has a history of riverboats. Australia's biggest river, the Murray, has an inland port called Echuca. Many large riverboats were working on the Murray, but now a lower water level is stopping them. The Kalgan River in Western Australia has had two main riverboats, the Silver Star, 1918 to 1935, would lower her funnel to get under the low bridge. Today, the Kalgan Queen riverboat takes tourists up the river to taste the local wines. She lowers her roof to get under the same bridge.

It is these early steam-driven river craft that typically come to mind when "steamboat" is mentioned, as these were powered by burning wood, with iron boilers drafted by a pair of tall smokestacks belching smoke and cinders, and twin double-acting pistons driving a large paddlewheel at the stern, churning foam. This type of propulsion was an advantage as a rear paddlewheel operates in an area clear of snags, is easily repaired, and is not likely to suffer damage in a grounding.  By burning wood, the boat could consume fuel provided by woodcutters along the shore of the river. These early boats carried a brow (a short bridge) on the bow, so they could head in to an unimproved shore for transfer of cargo and passengers.

Modern riverboats are generally screw (propeller)-driven, with pairs of diesel engines of several thousand horsepower.

The standard reference for the development of the steamboat is Steamboats on Western Rivers: An Economic and Technological History by Louis C. Hunter (1949).

Terrace, British Columbia, Canada, celebrates "Riverboat Days" each summer.  The Skeena River passes through Terrace and played a crucial role during the age of the steamboat.  The first steam-powered vessel to enter the Skeena was the Union in 1864.  In 1866 the Mumford attempted to ascend the river but was only able to reach the Kitsumkalum River. It was not until 1891 that the Hudson's Bay Company sternwheeler the Caledonia successfully negotiated through the Kitselas Canyon and reached Hazelton. A number of other steamers were built around the turn of the century, in part due to the growing fish industry and the gold rush.

The WT Preston, a museum ship that was once a specialised river dredge, also called a "snagboat".

Modern riverboats

Luxury tourist transport
Some large riverboats are comparable in accommodation, food service, and entertainment to a modern oceanic cruise ship.  Tourist boats provide a scenic and relaxing trip through the segment they operate in.

On the Yangtze River, typically employees have double duties: both as serving staff and as evening-costumed dancers.

Smaller luxury craft (without entertainment) operate on European waterways - both rivers and canals, with some providing bicycle and van side trips to smaller villages.

High-speed passenger transport

High-speed boats such as those shown here had a special advantage in some operations in the free-running Yangtze. In several locations within the Three Gorges, one-way travel was enforced through fast narrows. While less maneuverable and deeper draft vessels were obliged to wait for clearance, these high-speed boats were free to zip past waiting traffic by running in the shallows.

Local and low-cost passenger transport

Smaller riverboats are used in urban and suburban areas for sightseeing and public transport. Sightseeing boats can be found in Amsterdam, Paris, and other touristic cities where historical monuments are located near water.

The concept of local waterborn public transport is known as water taxi in English-speaking countries, vaporetto in Venice, water/river tramway in former Soviet Union and Poland (although sightseeing boats can be called water tramways too). Local waterborne public transport is similar to ferry.

The transport craft shown below is used for short-distance carriage of passengers between villages and small cities along the Yangtze, while larger craft are used for low-cost carriage over longer distance, without the fancy food or shows seen on the tourist riverboats. In some cases, the traveller must provide their own food.

Goods transport

Multimodal

As the major rivers in China are mostly east-west, most rail and road transport are typically north-south. As roads along the rivers are inadequate for heavy truck transport and in some cases extremely dangerous, drive-on/drive-off ramp barges are used to transport trucks. In many cases the trucks transported are new and are being delivered to customers or dealers.

Bulk cargo
Low-value goods are transported on rivers and canals worldwide, since slow-speed barge traffic offers the lowest possible cost per ton mile and the capital cost per ton carried is also quite low compared to other modes of transport.

See also

Barge
Chain boat
Life on the Mississippi
Ferryboat
Fireboat
Charles T. Hinde, a riverboat captain in the 1800s.
Hydrofoil
Keelboat
List of steamboats on the Columbia River
McKenzie River dory
Murray-Darling steamboats
Narrowboat
P.A. Denny (ship)
Paddle steamer
River cruise
Sampan
Shitik
Steamboat
Steamboats of the Mississippi
Steamboats of the Columbia River
Steamboats of the upper Columbia and Kootenay Rivers
Steamboats of the Willamette River
Tourist sternwheelers of Oregon
Towboat
Tugboat
Frederick Way Jr.
Lewis and Clark's Keelboat

References

Further reading

 Crump, Thomas, Abraham Lincoln's World: How Riverboats, Railroads, and Republicans Transformed America. (New York: Continuum, 2009) 272 pp. .
 Nolan, John Matthew. 2,543 Days: A History of the Hotel at the Grand Rapids Dam on the Wabash River 
 Nautical terminology specific to towboating and inland waterways.

Boat types